Ghaytun is a village in northern Aleppo Governorate, northwestern Syria. Nearby localities include Akhtarin  to the northeast, Ghuz  to the south, and Mare'  to the west. In the 2004 census, Ghaytun had a population of 1,080.

References

Populated places in Azaz District
Villages in Aleppo Governorate